Richard Höger (born 17 August 1972) is a Slovak former footballer and coach. He is an assistant coach with Zemplín Michalovce.

Honours

Slovan Bratislava
Slovak Super Liga: 1998–99
Slovak Cup: 1996–97, 1998–99

References

1972 births
Living people
Sportspeople from Prešov
Czechoslovak footballers
1. FC Tatran Prešov players
Slovak footballers
ŠK Slovan Bratislava players
Partizán Bardejov players
FC Lokomotiv Nizhny Novgorod players
Russian Premier League players
Slovak expatriate footballers
Expatriate footballers in Russia
Slovak expatriate sportspeople in Russia
FC Steel Trans Ličartovce players
Slovak football managers

Association football midfielders